Sphingomonas jaspsi  is a Gram-negative, aerobic, pleomorphic and motile bacteria from the genus of Sphingomonas which has been isolated from fresh water in Misasa in Japan. Sphingomonas jaspsi produces carotenoid.

References

Further reading

External links
Type strain of Sphingomonas jaspsi at BacDive -  the Bacterial Diversity Metadatabase	

japonica
Bacteria described in 2007